The Celaque climbing salamander (Bolitoglossa celaque) is a species of salamander in the family Plethodontidae.
It is endemic to Honduras.
Its natural habitat is subtropical or tropical moist montane forests.
It is threatened by habitat loss.

References

Bolitoglossa
Endemic fauna of Honduras
Taxonomy articles created by Polbot
Amphibians described in 1993